Jean de Dieu Nkundabera is a Rwandan athlete who competes in paralympic athletics.

Nkundabera represented Rwanda at the 2004 Summer Paralympics in Athens, and won his country's first ever Paralympic or Olympic medal in any sport, by taking bronze in the T46 men's 800 metre race, with a time of 1:58.95. He represented Rwanda again at the 2008 Summer Paralympics in Beijing.

As of 2016, Nkundabera remains Rwanda's sole Olympic or Paralympic medalist of any kind, despite Rwanda having a population of over 300,000 people with some sort of disability.

References

Athletes (track and field) at the 2004 Summer Paralympics
Athletes (track and field) at the 2008 Summer Paralympics
Paralympic athletes of Rwanda
Paralympic bronze medalists for Rwanda
Living people
Medalists at the 2004 Summer Paralympics
Rwandan male middle-distance runners
Year of birth missing (living people)
Paralympic medalists in athletics (track and field)